All-Serb Assembly (Свесрпски сабор) is the name given to several assemblies gathering Serb activists:

All-Serb Assembly (15 April 1990).
All-Serb Assembly in Srb (25 July 1990), organized by the Serb Democratic Party, gathering of 150,000 Serbs with chosen delegates from Serb municipalities (12 municipalities), leading to the establishment of the Serb National Council.
All-Serb Assembly in Donja Gradina (16 September 1990).
All-Serb Assembly in Banja Luka.
All-Serb Assembly in Pristina (25–26 January 1997), organized by the Serbian Renewal Movement and Eparchy of Raška and Prizren.

See also
All-Serb Congress in Chicago (1947).

References

Sources

History of the Serbs
Serbian nationalism
1990 in politics
1990 in Yugoslavia